Vivi Oktavia Riski (born 7 March 1997) is an Indonesian footballer who plays as a midfielder for Asprov Babel and the Indonesia women's national team.

Club career
Vivi has played for Persib Bandung and Asprov Babel in Indonesia.

International career 
Vivi represented Indonesia at the 2022 AFC Women's Asian Cup.

International goals

Honours

Club
Persib Bandung
 Liga 1 Putri: 2019

References

External links

1997 births
Living people
Sportspeople from the Bangka Belitung Islands
Indonesian women's footballers
Women's association football midfielders
Indonesia women's international footballers